Skeleton Warriors is a 13-episode cartoon series created by Landmark Entertainment Group, which originally aired in 1994 on CBS. The show was created by producer Gary Goddard.

Summary
The story takes place on the fictional distant planet of "Luminaire". The conflict of the plot revolves around the need to control the Lightstar Crystal, which powers the great city of Luminicity. Baron Dark, the show's main villain, tried to steal the crystal in order to gain control over its incredible power. He only succeeded in obtaining half of the crystal, with the other half being obtained by Prince Lightstar.

The half of the crystal that the Baron Dark managed to obtain turns him into a living skeleton. It also gives him the power to turn those with evil hearts into living skeletons for his army. Each episode involves Prince Lightstar, his siblings and Baron Dark attempting to obtain the other half of their respective crystals in order to gain control over the planet.

Prince Lightstar forms part of the "Legion of Light." It consists of Justin Lightstar a.k.a. Prince Lightstar, Joshua Lightstar a.k.a. Grimskull, and Jennifer Steele a.k.a. Talyn. They also have been endowed with great powers through their half of the Crystal. They team together with their uncle Ursak (a.k.a. Guardian) to battle the evil Baron Dark. While Baron Dark is transformed into an undead skeleton and given the ability to transform other living beings into his Skeleton Warriors, the Legion of Light gains other fantastic abilities: Lightstar gains the ability to channel energy through his hands, Talyn gains the power of flight, and Grimskull is transformed into an undead creature similar to the Baron, but also has the power to travel through shadows.

Characters
Justin Steele/Prince Lightstar

Prince Justin is the leader of the Legion of Light and the one meant to protect the Lightstar Crystal. After its loss, he continually strives to protect humanity and defeat the skeleton warriors. He greatly frustrates the Baron by displaying the clear limits to his power: a person of good heart cannot be turned into a skeleton warrior. When the Lightstar Crystal was shattered, Justin received the ability to project powerful beams of energy out of his hands or through his sword, which later is declared by Ursak to be (or possibly contain, considering the relative sizes of the sword and crystal) an actual piece of the Lightstar Crystal.

Jennifer Steele/Talyn

Talyn is a fierce warrior, a gracious princess, a caring soul, and an unwavering defender of the righteous. She somehow manages to combine all her devotion to the fight against evil with great compassion. After the struggle which shattered the Lightstar Crystal, she was granted the power of flight and managed to reconcile Justin and Joshua. Her later exploits include finding a way to actually restore skeleton warriors to the flesh – by removing the "heart gems" that appear after the transformation. Although this discovery is a tactical advantage and a source of hope, it also spurred Baron Dark on to worse acts; if any skeleton warrior is restored to human form, he could use his power to transform them back into skeletons, but, since he was the only one who possessed this power, if he himself was restored, no one else would be able to transform him back into a living skeleton.

Joshua Steele/Grimskull

Justin's younger brother, who initially worked together with Baron Dark out of misplaced envy of his older brother. When Justin and Dark struggled for the Lightstar Crystal, Joshua interfered. The resulting surge of power turned him into an undead creature, but where Dark and his Skeleton Warriors are pure skeletons, Joshua - who was renamed Grimskull - is still covered in flesh. Grimskull is seeking redemption by helping his family; he saw the baron's evil during the fight which transformed him. Grimskull is granted the power to travel through shadows wherever he wishes. After his transformation, he befriended a wolf, which he named "Stalker."

 Ursak the Guardian

Ursak is the brother to the late king and the uncle to the Steele children. He serves as their adviser, second-in-command, mentor, and surrogate father. He is a skilled combatant who leads from the front, as well as a highly competent scientist designing various weapons and armor for the Legion of Light's members.

Baron Dark

The greedy and evil baron tried to seize the Lightstar crystal for himself and caused it to break in two. His half turned him into a living skeleton who has the power to turn any person with the slightest bit of darkness in his or her heart into a skeleton warrior like himself. Baron turns them into skeleton warriors with "Heartstones," and he says "Darkest Soul, Evil's Courier, Serve me as a Skeleton Warrior." He is obsessed with defeating the Legion of Light and taking control of both halves of the Lightstar Crystal, thereby granting absolute power for himself.

Dr. Cyborn

Dr. Cyborn is a half skeleton/half-machine who was Baron Dark's scientific expert and high-tech weapon maker. Dr. Cyborn is the Skeleton Legion's mad scientist and is Baron Dark's second-in-command. Self-created in his demented laboratory, Dr. Cyborn grafted bionic parts to his own body after a near-fatal accident. The scientist's dream came true when Baron Dark gave him his skeletal form. Now, this twisted genius serves the Baron as he devises weapons to destroy the Legion of Light.

Shriek

Previously a stunningly beautiful woman, Shriek with her evil heart was transformed into a female Skeleton Warrior in order to "add a woman's touch," according to Baron Dark. In the days prior to becoming a living Skeleton, Shriek was powerfully attracted to Prince Joshua. After she became a Skeleton Warrior her crush persists, albeit unreciprocated. According to the Skeleton Warriors presentation at Toy Fair 1994, the character's working name was "Banshee."

Aracula

An arachnid-like creature possessing six arms before being turned into a Skeleton Warrior, Aracula speaks almost entirely of grunts, screeches, and other animal-like sounds. He serves mostly as a bodyguard and berserker-type fighter who tries to overwhelm his opponent through sheer brute force. He maintains his spider abilities despite being a skeleton. In "Long Live the King", it is revealed that his people have been enemies of humans for centuries.

 Dagger

Initially, Baron Dark's dwarfish, slavish aide, later his dwarfish, slavish, skeletal aide, but is mainly the baron's loyal servant. Even when he was briefly restored to the flesh, he continued to work for the baron's interests and longed to be restored to the skeletal state his master had imparted upon him.

 Claw 
A werewolf-like creature hired by Baron Dark to patrol Luminicity for anyone who tried to cheat him out of tribute money.  After skeletonizing himself, Claw joined the rest of Dark's lieutenants.

Episodes

Home media
Skeleton Warriors was released in a 2-disc set on December 6, 2011 in North America, featuring all 13 episodes.

Voice cast
Jeff Bennett as Justin Steele/Prince Lightstar
Nathan Carlson as Dr. Cyborn
Philip Lewis Clarke as Baron Dark
Michael Corbett as Aracula
Jennifer Hale as Jennifer Steele/Talyn
Danny Mann as Ursak the Guardian, Dagger
Valery Pappas as Shriek
Kevin Schon as Joshua Steele/Grimskull

Additional voices

Earl Boen
Jim Cummings
Paul Eiding
Jeannie Elias
Linda Gary
Michael Gough

Tony Jay
Richard Molinare
Jan Rabson
Kevin Michael Richardson
Rodney Saulsberry

Crew
Susan Blu - Voice Director

Merchandise

The cartoon also spawned a toyline created by Playmates Toys, a comic book limited series created by Marvel Comics and the Skeleton Warriors video game for the Sega Saturn and PlayStation consoles developed by Neversoft and published by Playmates Interactive.

References

External links

Skeleton Warriors at Don Markstein's Toonopedia Archived from the original on June 4, 2017.
Skeleton Warriors @ comicbookdb.com

1990s American animated television series
1990s American science fiction television series
1994 American television series debuts
1994 American television series endings
American children's animated action television series
American children's animated comedy television series
American children's animated drama television series
American children's animated horror television series
American children's animated science fantasy television series
American children's animated space adventure television series
Action figures
CBS original programming
Fictional skeletons
Playmates Toys
Television shows adapted into video games
English-language television shows
Television series set on fictional planets